Wild Bill Lake is a , barrier-free fishing lake located  southwest of Red Lodge in Carbon County, Montana, in the United States. It is part of the Custer Gallatin National Forest and is surrounded by the  Wild Bill National Recreation Trail. The lake is regularly stocked with rainbow trout. Wild Bill Lake was named in honor of Wild Bill Kurtzer, who frequently fished there.

See also
List of lakes in Montana

References

Lakes of Montana
Lakes of Carbon County, Montana